The following is a partial list of rock formations in the United States, organized by state.

Arizona

Antelope Canyon
Canyon de Chelly National Monument
Spider Rock
Cathedral Rock, Red Rock State Park, Sedona
Cathedral Rock (Coconino County, Arizona)
Chaistla Butte
Chiricahua National Monument
Big Balanced Rock
Duck on a Rock
Mushroom Rock
Natural Bridge
Organ Pipe
Pinnacle Balanced Rock
Punch and Judy
Sea Captain
Church Rock
Comb Ridge
Coyote Buttes
The Wave
Grand Canyon
Angels Gate
Angels Window
Apollo Temple
Brahma Temple
Buddha Temple
Cheops Pyramid
Chuar Butte
Coronado Butte
Deva Temple
Dox Castle
Explorers Monument
Gunther Castle
Holy Grail Temple
Horseshoe Mesa
Manu Temple
Marsh Butte
Mount Hayden
Mount Sinyella
O'Neill Butte
Shiva Temple
Sinking Ship
Tower of Ra
Tower of Set
Vishnu Temple
Wotans Throne
Zoroaster Temple
Numerous other named buttes, mesas, and "temples"
Hole-in-the-Rock, Papago Park, Phoenix
LeChee Rock
Monument Valley
Hunts Mesa
Merrick Butte
The Mitten Buttes
North Window
Three Sisters
The Thumb
Totem Pole
Owl Rock
Petrified Forest National Park
Agate Bridge
Phallic Rock
Square Butte
Tonto Natural Bridge
Tower Butte
Weaver Needle, Superstition Mountains
Window Rock

California

Alabama Hills
Mobius Arch
Shark Fin
Bald Rock Dome
Bird Rock
Buttermilk Country
Calaveras Dome
Castle Crags
Castro Rocks
Charlotte Dome, Kings Canyon National Park
Death Valley National Park
The Grandstand
Manly Beacon
Zabriskie Point
Devils Postpile
Eagle Rock, Los Angeles
Eagle Rock, Pacific Crest Trail
Elephants Playground
Frog Woman Rock
Giant Rock
Goat Buttes
Gull Rock
Indian Rock, Indian Rock Park
Joshua Tree National Park
Skull Rock
Lover's Leap
Mono Lake Tufa State Natural Reserve
Moro Rock, Sequoia National Park
Morro Rock
Mussel Rock
Nine Sisters (aka "The Morros"), San Luis Obispo
Pinnacles National Park
Potato Chip Rock
Rainbow Basin
Red Rock Canyon
Robbers Roost
San Pedro Rock
Santee Boulders
Scotia Bluffs
Seal Rocks (San Francisco, California)
Seal Rock (San Mateo County, California)
Sears Rock
Stoney Point
Suicide Rock
Sutter Buttes
Tahquitz Rock
Trona Pinnacles
Vasquez Rocks
Yosemite National Park
Cathedral Rocks
Clouds Rest
El Capitan
Glacier Point
Half Dome
Kolana Rock
Leaning Tower
Lembert Dome
Little Devils Postpile
Lost Arrow Spire
Royal Arches
Sentinel Rock
Three Brothers

Colorado

Castle Rock
Chimney Rock
Chimney Rock (Jackson Butte)
Colorado National Monument
Coke Ovens
Devils Kitchen
Grand View Spire
Independence Monument
Kissing Couple
Pipe Organ
Sentinel Spire
Terra Tower
Window Rock
Curecanti Needle
Garden of the Gods
Lizard Head
Painted Wall, Black Canyon of the Gunnison National Park
Petit Grepon, Rocky Mountain National Park
Point Lookout, Mesa Verde National Park
Red Rocks Amphitheatre
Steamboat Rock
Wheeler Geologic Area

Georgia
Broxton Rocks
Rock City, Lookout Mountain
Stone Mountain

Hawaii

Iao Needle, Maui
Gardner Pinnacles, Northwestern Hawaiian Islands

Idaho

City of Rocks National Reserve
Craters of the Moon National Monument and Preserve

Illinois

Garden of the Gods, Shawnee National Forest

Indiana

Devil's Backbone, near Charlestown
Hanging Rock, near Lagro
Jug Rock, near Shoals
Portland Arch, near Fountain

Iowa

Gitchie Manitou State Preserve, Granite, Lyon County

Kansas

Castle Rock, Quinter
Monument Rocks, Oakley
Mushroom Rock State Park, Carneiro
Rock City, Minneapolis

Kentucky

Mantle Rock, Livingston County
Natural Bridge
Red River Gorge
Raven Rock

Massachusetts

Farley Ledges
Mother Ann
Plymouth Rock
Profile Rock
Redemption Rock

Michigan

Arch Rock (Mackinac County)
Big Rock (Montmorency County)
Brockway Mountain (Keweenaw County)
Castle Rock (Mackinac County)
Chapel Rock (Alger County)
Chapel Cove (Alger County)
Devil's Kitchen (Mackinac County)
Grand Portal Point (Alger County)
Hendrie River Water Cave (Mackinac County)
Huron Mountains (Baraga & (Marquette Counties)
Isle Royale (Keweenaw County)
Lake Michigan Stonehenge (Grand Traverse County)
Lake of the Clouds (Ontonagon County)
Lovers' Leap (Alger County)
Miner's Castle (Alger County)
Presque Isle & Little Presque Isle (Marquette County)
Skull Cave (Mackinac County)
Tahquamenon Falls (Chippewa & Luce Counties)
Turnip Rock (Huron County)
The Thumbnail (Huron County)

Minnesota

Barn Bluff
Devil's Kettle, Judge C. R. Magney State Park
In-Yan-Teopa, Frontenac State Park
Palisade Head
Sugar Loaf

Missouri

Elephant Rocks State Park, Iron County
Grand Gulf State Park, Oregon County
Hughes Mountain, Washington County
Johnson's Shut-Ins State Park, Reynolds County
Tower Rock, Perry County

Montana

Beaverhead Rock
Castle Rock Spire
Chief Mountain, Glacier National Park
Chinese Wall
Devil's Slide
Eye of the Needle (collapsed in 1997)
LaBarge Rock
Makoshika State Park
Medicine Rocks State Park
Pompeys Pillar
Pumpelly Pillar

Nebraska

Chimney Rock
Courthouse and Jail Rocks
Scotts Bluff National Monument

Nevada

Bridge Mountain's natural arch
Lexington Arch, Great Basin National Park
Little Finland, Gold Butte National Monument
Red Rock Canyon
Valley of Fire State Park
Elephant Rock
Fire Wave (similar to but smaller than The Wave in Arizona)
Natural Arch (collapsed in 2010)

New Hampshire

Madison Boulder
Old Man of the Mountain (collapsed in 2003)

New Jersey

The Palisades

New Mexico

Ah-Shi-Sle-Pah Wilderness Study Area
Barber Peak
Bennett Peak
Bisti/De-Na-Zin Wilderness
Cathedral Cliff
City of Rocks State Park, Grant County
Echo Amphitheater
El Morro National Monument
Ford Butte
Kneeling Nun, Hanover, Grant County
Mitten Rock
Natural Bridge, Corona, Lincoln County
Needles Eye, Cooney, Catron County
Needles Eye Arch and Little Needles Eye Arch, Florida Mountains, Luna County
Saddle Rock, Grant County
Shiprock
Kasha-Katuwe Tent Rocks National Monument, Cochiti
Tooth of Time, Colfax County
Victorio Peak

New York

Chimney Bluffs State Park
Lemon Squeezer, Harriman State Park
The Palisades
Rat Rock, Central Park, New York City
Sam's Point Preserve
Stark's Knob
Watkins Glen State Park

North Carolina

Blowing Rock
Chimney Rock State Park
Hanging Rock State Park
Cook’s Wall
Hanging Rock
House Rock
Moore’s Knob
Wolf Rock
Judaculla Rock
Looking Glass Rock
McRae Peak, Grandfather Mountain

Oklahoma

Rock Mary

Oregon

Crater Lake
Phantom Ship
Wizard Island
Fort Rock, Lake County
Haystack Rock, Clatsop County
Haystack Rock, Tillamook County
The Honeycombs, Malheur County
Llao Rock
Malheur Butte, Malheur County
Mitchell Point
Pilot Rock, Jackson County
Rooster Rock, Multnomah County
Smith Rock, Deschutes County
Skinner Butte, Lane County
Spencer Butte, Lane County

Pennsylvania

Bilger's Rocks
Indian God Rock
Ticklish Rock

South Dakota

Mount Rushmore
The Needles, Custer State Park

Tennessee

Chimney Rocks, Campbell County
Twin Arches, Pickett County

Texas

Big Bend National Park
Elephant Tusk
Mule Ears
Santa Elena Canyon
Duffy's Peak
El Capitan, Guadalupe Mountains National Park
Enchanted Rock, Gillespie County/Llano County
Hueco Tanks, Hueco Tanks State Park & Historic Site, El Paso County
Palo Duro Canyon, Amarillo
Spy Rock, Mason County

Utah

 Arches National Park
 Balanced Rock
 Courthouse Towers
 Dark Angel
 Delicate Arch
 Devils Garden
 Double Arch
 Fiery Furnace
 Landscape Arch
 Petrified Dunes
 The Phallus
 Wall Arch (collapsed in 2008)
 Bears Ears National Monument
 Bridger Jack Butte
 Sixshooter Peaks
 Bottleneck Peak
 Boundary Butte
 Bryce Canyon National Park
 Sinking Ship
 Thor's Hammer
 Buttes of the Cross
 Canyonlands National Park
 Airport Tower
 Angel Arch
 Aztec Butte
 Candlestick Tower
 Chip and Dale Towers
 Druid Arch
 Elaterite Butte
 Island in the Sky
 Junction Butte
 Mesa Arch
 Tiki Tower
 Monster Tower
 Upheaval Dome
 Washer Woman
 Whale Rock
 Zeus and Moses
 Capitol Reef National Park
 Capitol Dome
 Capitol Gorge
 Cassidy Arch
 The Castle
 Cathedral Mountain
 Chimney Rock
 EPH Hanks Tower
 Ferns Nipple
 Golden Throne
 Hickman Bridge
 Jailhouse Rock
 Navajo Dome
 Needle Mountain
 Pectols Pyramid
 Temples of the Sun and Moon
 Waterpocket Fold
 Castle Rock
 Castleton Tower
 Cave Knoll
 Cedar Breaks National Monument
 Corona Arch
 Coyote Buttes
 Dead Horse Point State Park
 Devil's Slide
 Dominguez Butte
 Eagle Crags
 Ekker Butte
 Elephant Rock, Kings Canyon, Millard County
 Fantasy Canyon
 Fisher Towers
 Goblin Valley State Park
 Mollys Castle
 Wild Horse Butte
 Grand Staircase–Escalante National Monument
 Coyote Gulch
 Devils Garden
 Grosvenor Arch
 Hole in the Rock
 Peekaboo Canyon
 Spooky Canyon
 Zebra Canyon
 Gregory Butte
 Gunsight Butte
 Kodachrome Basin State Park
 Lone Rock (Lake Powell)
 Merrimac Butte
 Mexican Hat
 Natural Bridges National Monument
 Kachina Natural Bridge
 Owachomo Natural Bridge
 Sipapu Natural Bridge
 Newspaper Rock State Historic Monument
 Notch Peak
 Parriott Mesa
 Rainbow Bridge National Monument
 San Rafael Reef
 Sister Superior
 The Convent
 The Rectory
 Valley of the Gods
 Wilson Arch
 Zion National Park
 Aires Butte
 Altar of Sacrifice
 Angel's Landing
 Ant Hill
 Bee Hive
 Checkerboard Mesa
 Court of the Patriarchs
 The East Temple
 The Great White Throne
 Kolob Arch
 Meridian Tower
 Narrows
 North Guardian Angel
 The Organ
 Paria Point
 The Pulpit
 The Sentinel
 South Guardian Angel
 The Subway
 The Watchman
 The West Temple
 Three Patriarchs
 Three Marys
 The Witch Head
 Towers of the Virgin

Vermont

The Beam

Virginia

Humpback Rock
Natural Bridge
Natural Chimneys

Washington

Beacon Rock, Columbia River Gorge
Cupalo Rock
Gilhooley Tower
Jabberwocky Tower
Lexington Tower
Omak Rock
Ruby Beach, Olympic National Park
Sims Corner Eskers and Kames National Natural Landmark
Steamboat Rock, Steamboat Rock State Park
Steeple Rock, Olympic National Park
The Tooth

West Virginia

Cooper's Rock
Seneca Rocks, Pendleton County

Wisconsin

Dells of the Wisconsin River
Maiden Rock
Mill Bluff State Park
Natural Bridge State Park

Wyoming

Devil's Gate
Devils Tower
Hell's Half Acre
Independence Rock
Teapot Rock
Vedauwoo

References

 
Rock formation
Rock formations